Australia competed at the 1950 British Empire Games held in Auckland, New Zealand between 4 and 11 February 1950, after a 12-year gap from the third edition of the games. 
Australia won medals in eleven out of the eleven sports that it entered.

Medallists
The following Australian competitors won medals at the games.

|  style="text-align:left; width:78%; vertical-align:top;"|

| width="22%" align="left" valign="top" |

Team management
Honorary General Manager – Harold Wilkes 
Section Officials: Athletics Manager – Leonad Curnow, Athletics Manageress – Lillian Neville ; Boxing & Wrestling Manager – Ralph Jackson ; Cycling Manager – John Meagher ; Lawn Bowls Manager – Albert Newton ; Rowing Manager – Edward Kenny ; Rowing Coxed Four Coach – John Eddie, Rowing Eights Coach – William Thomas ; Swimming Manager – Roy Thompson, Swimming Assistant Manager – Joseph Emerson ; Swimming Manageress – Margot Long, Swimming Coaches – Forbes Carlile, William Holland ; Diving Coaches – Allan Mott, Leonard Warner ; Water Polo Manager – Bill Berge Phillips ; Weightlifting Manager

See also
 Australia at the 1948 Summer Olympics
 Australia at the 1952 Summer Olympics

References

External links 
Commonwealth Games Australia Results Database

1950
Nations at the 1950 British Empire Games
British Empire Games